Balta verticalis is a species from the genus Balta.

References

Cockroaches